Impatiens johnii is a species of balsam with a restricted distribution in the Munnar region of southern India. The species was first described by Edward Barnes in 1939 and it was not recorded in the wild again until 1999. The species has a restricted geographic distribution and is therefore considered endangered. It is known from  the Pettimudy area and flowers from September to December.

References 

Balsaminaceae
Threatened flora of Asia